The 2015 Mississippi State Bulldogs baseball team represented Mississippi State University in the 2015 season of NCAA Division I baseball.

Pre-season
The 2015 MSU baseball team has Collegiate Baseball's No. 3 ranked recruiting class in 2015 according to Collegiate Baseball. This is the third straight top 10 class, following No. 2 in 2013 and No. 6 in 2014.

Schedule and results
Game results and box scores can be found at the reference.

Rankings

MLB Draft
No players were drafted.

References 

Mississippi State Bulldogs Baseball Team, 2015
Mississippi State Bulldogs baseball seasons
Miss